Neptis loma, the Loma sailer, is a butterfly in the family Nymphalidae. It is found in Sierra Leone, Ivory Coast, Ghana (the Volta Region) and Nigeria. The habitat consists of forests.

References

Butterflies described in 1971
loma